Mouha Ou Hammou Zayani, by his full name: Mohammed ou Hammou ben Akka ben Ahmed, also known as Moha Ou Hamou al-Harkati Zayani (c.1863 – 27 March 1921) was a Moroccan Berber military figure and tribal leader who played an important role in the history of Morocco. He was the leader (Qaid) of the Zayanes people of Khénifra region. His full name was Muhammad Ou Hammou ben Aqqa ben Ahmad, and he is also known as Moha Ou Hamou al-Harkati Zayani. He was the son of Moha Ou Aqqa, the tribal leader of Ayt Harkat.

Biography 
Mouha was born in 1857 in the Middle Atlas. His father Moha ou Aqqa was the tribal leader of Ayt Harkat. After the death of Ou Aqqa, his oldest son, Said, succeeded him and extended his dominance over his tribe and the Zayane confederation. Mouha succeeded his brother after his death, in 1887. The Sultan Moulay Hassan I gave Mouha the title of Qaid in 1880 or 1886. After the Treaty of Fes (1912), which put Morocco under the French Protectorate, Zayani, at the head of the Zayanes tribe, started a guerrilla war, known as the Zaian War. He managed to unite several Berber tribes of the Middle Atlas and fought smaller battles. The town of Khénifra was lost to the advancing French forces in June 1914, but in November of the same year, the Battle of El Herri took place and Zayani inflicted heavy losses (around 600 casualties) upon the French military. The battle was later dubbed the 'Moroccan Dien Bien Phu' in reference to the decisive battle in the French Indochina War. Despite the victory, Zayani could not secure Khénifra and retired in to the region of Taoujgalt, where he recruited more men and prepared for further attacks against the French army. In May 1920, his sons Hassan and Amharoq who then led the Zayan tribe, surrendered to General Poeymirau. 
His daughter Rabaha married Sultan Abd al-Hafid.

Death
On 27 March 1921, Mouha was killed in a battle at Azelag N'Tazemourte against his son Hassan, who led a zayyani detachment.

Burial
He was buried at Ben Cherro near Tamalakt.

References

External links
 tomb of Moha ou Saïd in Ben Cherro

1857 births
1921 deaths
19th-century Moroccan people
20th-century Moroccan people
Berber Moroccans
Berber rebels
Moroccan Caids
Moroccan military leaders
Moroccan independence activists
People from Khenifra